The 1920 Drexel Dragons football team represented Drexel Institute—now known as Drexel University—in the 1920 college football season. Led by William McAvoy in his first season as head coach, the team compiled a record of 0–6.

Schedule

Roster

References

Drexel
Drexel Dragons football seasons
College football winless seasons
Drexel Dragons football